Nigel Sharp is an Australian conservationist and biodiversity impact investor known for his work on the continent of Australia with threatened species conservation, new business models of regenerative agriculture and urbanism, nature-based tourism, and indigenous enterprise development.

Early years
Nigel Sharp was born on July 28, 1961, in Hamilton, Victoria, Australia. Growing up on his family’s farm in Branxholme, Victoria, he later credited much of his interest and passion for conservation through helping his father plant and protect creek lines on their farm and in surrounding areas, to combat rising soil salinity levels, which was a major issue at the time.

Career
Sharp began his career as a qualified property valuer, and gained experience running a listed company trust. He worked in senior positions across the property funds management and property development industries, including both rural and urban property projects.

He began involvement in conservation in 2000 when he helped rescue the predator-free ecosystem at Mt Rothwell Sanctuary Little River, Victoria and introduced a breeding program for species such as the Eastern Quoll, Eastern barred bandicoot and Southern Brush-tailed Rock-wallaby.

In 2010, he and business partner Harry Youngman, widened their collective conservation work by purchasing Tiverton Farm, a  working sheep property in Western Victoria, for the purpose of eradicating non-native species and reintroducing Eastern Barred Bandicoot and Eastern Quoll, while maintaining a viable agricultural business.

In 2016 Sharp founded the Odonata Foundation, specialising in the business of biodiversity. Odonata designs and manages financially sustainable conservation projects, educating the public and empowering businesses to embrace biodiversity,. Odonata projects have included the National Sanctuary Network (formerly the South-East Australia Sanctuary Operations Network), the Great Australian Wildlife Search, Odonata Academy, Melbourne Skyfarm, Wild Idea Business Incubator, and the organisation manages both Tiverton Farm and Mt Rothwell Biodiversity Interpretation Centre.

In 2017, the knowledge gained from projects at Mt Rothwell and Tiverton Farm enabled, Nigel Sharp and Harry Youngman to establish Tiverton-Rothwell and the Tiverton Agricultural Impact Fund to promote regenerative agricultural practices and demonstrate farming’s importance in protecting and restoring natural capital. Among other projects the Fund is responsible for the purchase of Juanburg station, a site of a globally significant conservation, and a project to restore the Great Cumbung Swamp in partnership with The Nature Conservancy Australia.

Key conservation projects
2022 – Successfully returned a breeding population of Eastern Quolls into Tiverton Farm, returning the species to a region it had been extinct for 70 years.

2021 – Helped establish the Byron Bay mobile wildlife hospital, based in Knockrow, NSW.

2021 – Originated the concept of “regenerative urbanism” at the Glen Junor development outside Melbourne, creating a high value corridor connecting Brisbane Ranges National Park and the Werribee Gorge State Park.

2020 – Founded the South-East Australia Sanctuary Operations Network (now the National Sanctuary Network), bringing diversity and connectivity to threatened species conservation.

2020 – Secured the down-listing from extinct to critically endangered of the Eastern Barred Bandicoot.

2019 – Marshalled the emergency bushfire evacuation and translocation of Southern Brush-tailed Rock-wallabies from Canberra, saving them from local extinction.

2019 – Co-designed Melbourne SkyFarm Environmental Education Centre.

2017 – Integrated threatened species programs into three regenerative agriculture enterprises: Orana Park farm, Picardy Station and Sunland Fresh Fruit.

Awards and honours
The Australian Impact Investment Awards (2020) - Outstanding Individual Achievement

Zoos Victoria - Lifetime Achievement Award (2019)

References

1961 births
Living people
Australian conservationists